The Girl in the Other Room is the seventh studio album by Canadian singer Diana Krall, released on March 31, 2004, by Verve Records. In addition to cover versions, it is Krall's first album to include original material, which she co-wrote with her husband Elvis Costello.

Background
Krall wrote some of the songs for the album with her husband, English musician Elvis Costello. Krall told USA Today that she had wanted to try songwriting before but lacked the confidence. "I started writing when I was a student but didn't really have the confidence to [pursue] lyric-writing in great depth. I've never done anything so personal."

On the Verve Records website, Krall explains the songwriting for the album in more detail: "I wrote the music and then Elvis and I talked about what we wanted to say. I told him stories and wrote pages and pages of reminiscences, descriptions and images, and he put them into tighter lyrical form. For 'Departure Bay', I wrote down a list of things that I love about home, things I realized were different, even exotic, now that I've been away."

"Departure Bay" is written about her hometown of Nanaimo, British Columbia, on Vancouver Island and the first Christmas without her mother and finishes the album. The penultimate song on the album, "I'm Coming Through", is also about the death of her mother.

As well as the songs she co-wrote with Costello, Krall departs from the standards she has sung on previous albums by performing songs by contemporary performers such as Costello, Tom Waits, and Joni Mitchell, as well as a Chris Smither song previously performed by Bonnie Raitt. She also covered Mose Allison's "Stop This World".

Critical reception

A reviewer of NPR commented, "The release is a departure from her past work, in that it bypasses interpretations of jazz standards in favor of new songs written by Krall and her husband, Elvis Costello". Jum Santella of All About Jazz wrote, "Some of the songs come from a different direction than her previous material. Nothing can change her core jazz focus, however. The spirit of Nat King Cole, Jimmy Rowles and Ray Brown continues to guide her at every turn". Linda Serck of musicOMH added, "Yet this album doesn't just take you on Krall's journey, it's not that self-indulgent. The lyrics are universal, the jazz a whole tapestry of moods. The Girl In The Other Room is a melancholy and beautifully-crafted body of work, full of evocative images and sounds. It not only shows Krall to be a superb song-writer but also the real woman behind that elegant poster-girl".

Pamela Winters of Paste stated, "Diana Krall has been wowing mainstream audiences for the past decade with her smooth, spare sound. If you like your jazz tidy, shiny and highly competent, you probably already have her CDs cozied up to that well-worn copy of Come Away With Me. But if you're among the music snobs who, when she married Elvis Costello, wondered, 'What does he see in her?' The Girl in the Other Room will attempt to answer your question." A reviewer of Cosmopolis wrote, "The Girl in the Other Room is no album for jazz purists. However, it should allow her definitively break into the fan base of popular music to which she gives new impulses and a rarely-heard quality".

Track listing

Personnel
Credits adapted from the liner notes of The Girl in the Other Room.

Musicians

 Diana Krall – vocals, piano
 Anthony Wilson – guitar
 Neil Larsen – Hammond B-3 
 Christian McBride – bass 
 John Clayton – bass 
 Peter Erskine – drums 
 Jeff Hamilton – drums 
 Terri Lyne Carrington – drums

Technical

 Tommy LiPuma – production
 Diana Krall – production
 Al Schmitt – recording, mixing
 Brian Montgomery – recording assistance
 Steve Genewick – Pro Tools engineering
 Doug Sax – mastering
 Robert Hadley – mastering

Artwork

 Hollis King – art direction
 Isabelle Wong – design
 Mark Seliger – photography
 DJ Hunter – booklet back cover photo
 Donna Ranieri – photo production

Charts

Weekly charts

Year-end charts

Decade-end charts

Certifications

References

2004 albums
Albums produced by Diana Krall
Albums produced by Tommy LiPuma
Albums recorded at Capitol Studios
Diana Krall albums
Juno Award for Vocal Jazz Album of the Year albums
Verve Records albums